Rama Krishna High School is a school located in Karimnagar, Telangana, India. The school is co-educational and secular, located at Sai Nagar, Tower Circle, Karimnagar. Founded by Mr. Narsimha Reddy.

See also
Education in India
List of schools in India
List of institutions of higher education in Telangana

References

External links 

Karimnagar
High schools and secondary schools in Telangana
Educational institutions in India with year of establishment missing